Ohio's 29th senatorial district has historically been based in Canton, Ohio.  It now consists of the majority of Stark County.  It encompasses Ohio House districts 48, 49 and 50.  It has a Cook PVI of R+1.  Its Ohio Senator is Republican Kirk Schuring.  He resides in Canton, a city located in Stark County.

List of senators

External links
Ohio's 29th district senator at the 130th Ohio General Assembly official website

Ohio State Senate districts